Incurvaria praelatella is a moth of the family Incurvariidae. It is found in all of  Europe, except the Iberian Peninsula.

The wingspan is 11–14 mm.Head light yellow ochreous. Forewings dark fuscous, purplish-tinged; a basal dot, a sometimes interrupted fascia at 1/3, a triangular dorsal spot before tornus, and a larger costal spot beyond it pale ochreous -yellowish ; tips of apical cilia white. Hindwings rather dark bronzy-grey.

The larvae feed on Achillea, Agrimonia, Alchemilla vulgaris, Filipendula, Fragaria vesca, Geum rivale, Potentilla reptans, Rubus fruticosus and Spiraea douglasii. They mine the leaves of their host plant. The mine consists of a small full depth blotch, which is transparent at first. The mine starts at the leaf margin, mostly near the leaf tip. The frass is scattered about the mine in grains. There may be several mines in a single leaf.

References

External links

UKmoths
Lepidoptera of Belgium
Lepiforum.de
bladmineerders.nl

Incurvariidae
Moths of Europe
Taxa named by Michael Denis
Taxa named by Ignaz Schiffermüller
Moths described in 1775